Emmi Peltonen (born 29 November 1999) is a Finnish figure skater. She is the 2017 FBMA Trophy champion, the 2020 Nordic silver medalist, and a three-time Finnish national champion (2016, 2017, 2019). She has finished within the top ten at three European Championships.

She placed 20th at the 2018 Winter Olympics and is currently the 23rd highest ranked ladies' singles skater in the world by the International Skating Union following the 2019-20 figure skating season.

Personal life 
Peltonen was born on 29 November 1999 in Nashville, Tennessee. She has two brothers, twins Aleksi and Jesper (one year older), and a sister, Nelli (six years younger). Their Finnish parents –  Hanna, a former figure skater, and Ville Peltonen, a former ice hockey player – had moved to the United States due to his contract with the NHL's Nashville Predators franchise. The family returned to Finland a few years later. Her paternal grandfather, Esa Peltonen, is also a former professional ice hockey player.

Career

Early years 
Peltonen received her first skates when she was two years old and began learning to skate in 2002. She began competing on the advanced novice level at international events in the 2011–2012 season. She won the novice gold medal at the 2013 Nordic Championships.

2013–2014 season: Junior international debut 
Peltonen debuted on the junior international level in the 2013–2014 season. She won the junior silver medal at the Finnish Championships and Nordic Championships, both times finishing second to Jenni Saarinen.

2014–2015 season 
Virpi Horttana coached Peltonen at Espoo Skating Club in Espoo, Finland. Her ISU Junior Grand Prix (JGP) debut came in August 2014; she finished ninth at her assignment in Courchevel, France. Competing on the senior level at the Finnish Championships, she placed eighth in the short program, fourth in the free skate, and fourth overall.

2015–2016 season: Senior international debut 
In 2015–2016, Peltonen was coached by Sirkka Kaipio in Helsinki and Järvenpää, and by Rafael Arutyunyan in California. She placed fifteenth at her sole JGP assignment in Linz, Austria.

Making her senior international debut, Peltonen placed tenth at the Finlandia Trophy, a Challenger Series (CS) event in October 2015. She did not compete at the Finnish Championships in December but took the junior bronze medal at the Nordic Championships a couple of months later.

2016–2017 season 

During the summer, Peltonen trained with Arutyunyan in California. In August, she placed fifth at her JGP assignment in Saint Gervais-les-Bains, France. She then competed at several senior internationals, finishing twelfth at the CS Finlandia Trophy, fourteenth at the Volvo Open Cup, and sixth at the CS Warsaw Cup.

In December 2016, Peltonen won the senior gold medal at the Finnish Championships in Tampere, having outscored silver medalist Jenni Saarinen by eight points. She was named in Finland's team to the 2017 European Championships in Ostrava. Ranked fourteenth in the short program and ninth in the free skate, she finished eleventh overall in the Czech Republic.

Peltonen competed at the 2017 World Championships in Helsinki, Finland, but did not advance to the free skate, having placed twenty-ninth in the short program.

2017–2018 season 
In September 2017, Finland qualified a spot in the ladies event at the 2018 Winter Olympics due to Viveca Lindfors' result at the 2017 CS Nebelhorn Trophy. In December, Peltonen won her second consecutive national title, finishing ahead of silver medalist Lindfors by a margin of 4.22 points.

In January, Peltonen placed eleventh in the short program, eighth in the free skate, and ninth overall at the 2018 European Championships in Moscow, Russia; she was Finland's top lady at the event, finishing 11 points ahead of Lindfors. On 24 January 2018, the Finnish Olympic Committee selected Peltonen to compete at the Olympics.  She finished twentieth in the ladies' event.

2018–2019 season 
Peltonen began the new season at the 2018 CS Finlandia Trophy on home soil, finishing in fifth place, two ordinals below Lindfors, who won the bronze medal.  She then debuted on the Grand Prix series at the special 2018 Grand Prix of Helsinki, where she placed ninth.

Peltonen won the silver medal at the Finnish Championships, finishing behind Lindfors.  She finished eighth at the 2019 European Championships, while Lindfors won the bronze medal.  Based on the season's results, the Finnish Federation assigned Lindfors to Finland's lone ladies' spot at the 2019 World Championships.  However, Peltonen was subsequently given the spot following Lindors' withdrawal due to injury and placed twenty-eighth at the World Championships in Saitama.

2019–2020 season 
Assigned to only one Grand Prix event, the 2019 Rostelecom Cup, she placed twelfth among twelve skaters.  Withdrawing from some other events, she won the Finnish national title again and was assigned to compete at the European Championships.  She was fifth in the short program at the European Championships with a new personal best and described her "Caruso" program as her favourite to date.  Seventh in the free skate with one fall, she remained in fifth place overall.

After winning the silver medal at the Nordic Championships, Peltonen was scheduled to compete at the World Championships in Montreal, but those were cancelled as a result of the coronavirus pandemic.

2020–2021 season 
Peltonen was scheduled to compete on the Grand Prix at the 2020 Internationaux de France, but this event was cancelled as a result of the pandemic.

2021–2022 season 
Peltonen withdrew from her first two Challenger assignments, the Lombardia and Nebelhorn Trophies. At the 2021 CS Denis Ten Memorial Challenge, a third Challenger, she finished fourth and was later eighth at the 2021 CS Warsaw Cup before winning the Open d'Andorra.

Despite winning the bronze medal at the Finnish championships, Peltonen was assigned to one of the two Finnish berths at the 2022 European Championships. However, she subsequently withdrew from the European Championships due to an ankle injury.

2022–2023 season 
In her season debut at the Volvo Open Cup, Peltonen won the bronze medal. After contracting COVID-19, she was forced to withdraw from her other planned fall assignments, including the special home 2022 Grand Prix of Espoo.

Programs

Competitive highlights
GP: Grand Prix; CS: Challenger Series; JGP: Junior Grand Prix

References

External links
 

1999 births
Living people
Sportspeople from Helsinki
Sportspeople from Tennessee
Finnish female single skaters
American female single skaters
American people of Finnish descent
Figure skaters at the 2018 Winter Olympics
Olympic figure skaters of Finland
21st-century American women